Jörg Stiel (born 3 March 1968) is a Swiss former professional footballer who played as a goalkeeper. Since June 2021, he has been working as goalkeeper coach of Grasshopper Club Zürich.

He appeared in 409 Swiss Super League games during 14 seasons, representing in the competition Wettingen, St. Gallen and Zürich. Over an 18-year professional career, he also played in Germany with Borussia Mönchengladbach. Stiel was also part of the Swiss squad at Euro 2004.

Club career
Born in Baden, Stiel started his career with FC Wettingen, later playing for FC St. Gallen and FC Zürich in his native country. He also spent a season with Mexican club Toros Neza, before returning to St. Gallen in 1996.

For 2001–02, Stiel was signed by Borussia Mönchengladbach in the Bundesliga. He was the undisputed starter throughout his three-season stint in Germany, featuring in 96 matches all competitions comprised and relegating legendary Uwe Kamps to the substitutes bench.

In November 2006, Stiel joined Austrian side SC Rheindorf Altach as goalkeeping coach. On 19 July 2009, he returned to Borussia in the same capacity.

Stiel returned to his country in the summer of 2014, going on to work with FC Basel's youths as a goalkeeper coach.

International career
Stiel won 21 caps for Switzerland during three-and-a-half years, and was the country's first-choice at UEFA Euro 2004, appearing in all three group games in Portugal. In the 0–3 loss against England, one of the goals came after deflecting from the post onto the back of his head, although it was officially credited to Wayne Rooney.

After the tournament, where he was also named Man of the match in the 0–0 draw with Croatia, Stiel retired from playing altogether.

References

External links

Living people
1968 births
Swiss-German people
People from Baden, Switzerland
Association football goalkeepers
Swiss men's footballers
Swiss Super League players
Swiss Challenge League players
FC Wettingen players
FC St. Gallen players
FC Zürich players
Liga MX players
Toros Neza footballers
Bundesliga players
Borussia Mönchengladbach players
Switzerland international footballers
UEFA Euro 2004 players
Swiss expatriate footballers
Expatriate footballers in Mexico
Expatriate footballers in Germany
Swiss expatriate sportspeople in Mexico
Swiss expatriate sportspeople in Germany
Sportspeople from Aargau